The following is an armorial of the thirty individuals, who have served as governor general of Canada since Confederation.

To date, all governors general have been granted armorial achievements, otherwise known as coats of arms, with the most recent being granted to Mary Simon in 2022.

Prior to 1952, the majority of governors general inherited their arms and as such the designs of those arms usually do not reflect them personally. Plaster carvings of the coats of arms of the first twelve governors general after confederation, from Lord Monck to Lord Byng, are displayed in the chambers of the Speaker of the Senate of Canada.

Coats of arms of governors general

See also

List of governors general of Canada
Canadian heraldry
Arms of Canada
Roll of arms
Armorial of the governors-general of Australia
Armorial of the governors-general of New Zealand
Armorial of prime ministers of the United Kingdom
Armorial of the speakers of the British House of Commons

Notes

References

External links
Official website of the Governor General of Canada
The Public Register of Arms, Flags, and Badges of Canada

Governors General of Canada
Canadian heraldry
Canadian coats of arms